Roman Igorevich Kosyanchuk (born 24 October 1993) is a Russian football midfielder. He plays for FC Tekstilshchik Ivanovo.

Club career
He made his debut in the Russian Second Division for FC Rubin-2 Kazan on 25 April 2011 in a game against FC Zenit-Izhevsk Izhevsk.

He made his Russian Football National League debut for FC Neftekhimik Nizhnekamsk on 13 October 2013 in a game against FC Khimik Dzerzhinsk.

References

External links

1993 births
Sportspeople from Ashgabat
Living people
Russian footballers
Russian people of Ukrainian descent
FC Torpedo Moscow players
Association football midfielders
FC Rubin Kazan players
PFC Sochi players
FC Chertanovo Moscow players
FC Neftekhimik Nizhnekamsk players
FC Fakel Voronezh players
FC Olimp-Dolgoprudny players
FC Tekstilshchik Ivanovo players